The 2013 African Handball Cup Winners' Cup was the 29th edition, organized by the African Handball Confederation, under the auspices of the International Handball Federation, the international handball sport governing body. The tournament was held from April 19–27, 2013 in Hammamet, Nabeul and Tazarka, in Tunisia, contested by 13 teams and won by Al Ahly of Egypt.

Draw

Preliminary rounds

Group A

* Note:  Advance to quarter-finals Relegated to 9-12th classification

Group B

* Note:  Advance to quarter-finals Relegated to 9-12th classification** Penalty for failing to pay participation fees

Group C

* Note:  Advance to quarter-finals Relegated to 9-12th classification

Knockout stage
Championship bracket

5-8th bracket

9-12th bracket

Final standings

Awards

External links
 Results - cahbonline

References

African Handball Cup Winners' Cup
2013 in handball